Scharzfeld is a village in the borough of Herzberg am Harz in the district of Göttingen in South Lower Saxony, Germany.

Scharzfeld lies at a height of about 220 m above sea level and has 1,765 inhabitants (as at 1 October 2006).

The first recorded mention of Scharzfeld is in a deed that relates to the year 952 and was probably forged in the 13th century. This stated that Otto the Great confirmed Schartfelde and other villages as belonging to the monastery at Pöhlde.

Culture and places of interest 
  on the Steinberg
 Nature reserve (dry grassland) with views over Scharzfeld near the Steinkirche
 Unicorn Cave
 Scharzfels Castle ruins
 Großer Knollen and its pub

References

External links 
 Scharzfeld on the website for the town of Herzberg

Göttingen (district)
Herzberg am Harz